John Forde Cazabon (3 August 1914 – 22 June 1983) was an English actor and stage writer whose career began in Sydney, Australia.

History
Cazabon was born in Hertford, Hertfordshire, to violinist and composer Albert Cazabon (1883–1970) and Norah Cazabon née Delaney, a professional actress born in Australia. He had an older sister Norah Cazabon and a younger brother Robert Brendan Cazabon (born c. 1919), who was killed in action in 1941.

In 1927 the family moved to Sydney, where Albert Cazabon had secured the post of musical director to the Prince Edward Theatre's orchestra, and Gladys, née Curtin, a professional actress born in Australia.
Cazabon and sister Norah were members of Sydney's Impressionist Theatre in 1933 and in 1934, with their mother, joined the Independent Theatre and Pickwick Theatre Group, both run by Doris Fitton.
They later joined Beryl Bryant's group.

Albert Cazabon returned to London in 1936, living at Aberdeen Place, and was hired by the BBC, but Cazabon stayed behind and secretly married actress Margery Gielis of Toowoomba.

They had a son Charles who married Margaret Burns on 20 May 1967.

His sister Norah married Stephen Merivale of Middleton Hall, Leeds. Stephen was cousin of Philip Merivale who married Gladys Cooper.

Writer
An early venture into this field was the playlet Hearts to Mend in 1933.
Good Catch (musical) with George S. English
Stranger Walk In (comedy in three acts) at Bryant's Playhouse

As stage actor
Snappy Sydney (1933 revue)
The Corn Is Green at the Minerva Theatre

Radio
The First Gentleman (1949) with Robert Morley and Queenie Ashton
Mary Livingstone MD (drama serial) as Russ Livingstone
Journey Into Space for BBC Radio

Screen career
Eureka Stockade (1949)
Curtain Up (1952)
Mandy (1952)
The Queen in Australia (1954) (commentary)
The Shiralee (1957)
The Snake Woman (1961)
Mary Had a Little... (1961)
Edgar Wallace Mysteries (1961, TV series episode "Backfire!") as Willy Kyser
The Prisoner (1968, TV series episode Once Upon a Time) as Umbrella Man

Recognition
Macquarie Award 1948 for part in radio play Sleeping Clergyman
Macquarie Award 1950 for part in comedy

References

External links

1914 births
1983 deaths
English male film actors
English male radio actors
English people of Australian descent
People from Hertford
20th-century English male actors
20th-century English dramatists and playwrights
English male dramatists and playwrights
20th-century English male writers